The Singoalla 34, also called the Albin Singoalla, is a Swedish sailboat designed by Per Brohäll as a cruiser and first built in 1970. The boat's designation is from a gypsy woman's name from a medieval legend and film.

The design is an enlarged development of the Brohäll-designed Vega 27. It was not a commercial success and did not remain in production long, with only a few boats sold.

Production
The design was built by Albin Marine in Sweden, starting in 1970, but the design did not sell well and production soon ended.

Design
The Singoalla 34 is a recreational keelboat, built predominantly of fibreglass, with wood trim. It has a masthead sloop rig with aluminum spars, a deck-stepped mast, wire standing rigging and a single set of unswept spreaders. The hull has a raked stem, a slightly angled transom, a skeg-mounted rudder controlled by a wheel and a fixed fin keel. It displaces  and carries  of ballast.

The design has sleeping accommodation for six people, with a double "V"-berth in the bow cabin, a "U"-shaped settee and a straight settee with a drop leaf table in the main cabin and an aft cabin with a double berth on the starboard side. The galley is located on the port side just forward of the companionway ladder. The galley is "U"-shaped and is equipped with a two-burner stove and a sink. A navigation station is opposite the galley, on the starboard side. The enclosed head is located just aft of the bow cabin on the port side.

See also
List of sailing boat types

Related development
Vega 27

References

Keelboats
1970s sailboat type designs
Sailing yachts
Sailboat type designs by Per Brohäll
Sailboat types built by Albin Marine